Oleg Nedashkovskiy (born 9 September 1987) is a Kazakhstani footballer. He played in one match for the Kazakhstan national football team in 2013.

Career
Nedashkovskiy made his international debut for Kazakhstan on 4 June 2013 in a friendly international match against Bulgaria in Almaty Central Stadium, which finished as a 2–1 home loss.

References

External links 
 

1987 births
Living people
Kazakhstani footballers
Kazakhstan international footballers
Association football midfielders
People from Taraz